The Gula language, or Tar Gula, of the Central African Republic, commonly known as Kara, is a Central Sudanic language or dialect cluster. The term "Kara" is also attached to numerous ethnic groups of the region and their languages, and so is often ambiguous.

Names
Ethnologue lists Gula du Mamoun, Kara (of South Sudan) and Yamegi as synonyms, and Molo, Mele, Mot-Mar (Moto-Mara), Sar (Sara), Mere, and Zura (Koto) as dialects.

Classification
Sources disagree as to whether Gula shares a Kara branch with other languages, with proposed Kara languages in one classification reassigned to other branches in other classifications. (See Kara languages.)

Locations
As of 2013, ethnic Kara were reported to be residing in Menamba Boma, Ringi Payam, Raja County.

References

Bongo–Bagirmi languages
Languages of the Central African Republic
Central African Republic–South Sudan relations